The 1935–36 La Liga was the eighth edition of the Spanish national league, and the last one before the Spanish Civil War. The season started November 10, 1935, and finished April 19, 1936.

Athletic Bilbao achieved their fourth title. Hércules and Osasuna made their debuts in La Liga.

Team locations

League table

Results

Relegation play-off
After the Spanish Civil War, Oviedo withdrew from the 1939–40 La Liga, so their place was decided to be occupied by the winner of a play-off between Athletic Madrid, now Athletic Aviación, and Osasuna; the two last qualified teams in the previous season.

|}

Top scorers

Pichichi Trophy
Note: This list is the alternative top scorers list provided by newspaper Diario Marca; it differs from the one above which is based on official match reports.

References
La Liga Top Scorers 1935-36

Literature
Martínez Calatrava, Vicente (2001). Historia y estadística del fúbol español. De la Olimpiada de Amberes a la Guerra Civil (1920-1939).

External links
LFP website

1935-1936
1935–36 in Spanish football leagues
Spain